Coelachyrum is a genus of Asian and African plants in the grass family.

 Species
 Coelachyrum brevifolium Hochst. & Nees - Algeria, Egypt, Mali, Mauritania, Niger, Nigeria, Chad, Sudan, Ethiopia, Eritrea, Somalia, Oman, Yemen, Saudi Arabia, Persian Gulf sheikdoms
 Coelachyrum lagopoides (Burm.f.) Senaratna  - India, Bangladesh, Sri Lanka
 Coelachyrum longiglume Napper  - Somalia, Kenya Tanzania
 Coelachyrum piercei (Benth.) Bor - Somalia, Oman, Yemen, Saudi Arabia, Persian Gulf sheikdoms, Pakistan
 Coelachyrum poiflorum Chiov. - Djibouti, Eritrea, Ethiopia, Somalia, Oman, Yemen, Saudi Arabia,

 formerly included
see Aeluropus Desmazeria 
 Coelachyrum annuum -  Desmazeria philistaea 
 Coelachyrum indicum - Aeluropus lagopoides 
 Coelachyrum yemenicum - Disakisperma yemenicum

References

Chloridoideae
Poaceae genera
Grasses of Africa
Grasses of Asia
Taxa named by Christian Gottfried Daniel Nees von Esenbeck